The Coupe du Gabon Interclubs is the top knockout tournament of the Gabonese football.

Winners
1961-63 : unknown
1964 : AS Mangasport (Moanda)
1965-77 : unknown
1978 : AS Stade Mandji (Ogooué-Maritime)
1979 : AS Stade Mandji (Ogooué-Maritime)
1980-83 : unknown
1984 : ASMO/FC 105 (Libreville) 2-1 AS Sogara (Port-Gentil)
1985 : AS Sogara (Port-Gentil)
1986 : ASMO/FC 105 (Libreville)
1987 : USM Libreville bt Mbilinga FC (Port-Gentil)
1988 : Vantour Mangoungou (Libreville) 1-0 Shellsport (Port-Gentil)
1989 : Petrosport (Port-Gentil)
1990 : Shellsport (Port-Gentil)
1991 : USM Libreville
1992 : Delta Sports (Libreville) 4-0 ASMO/FC 105 (Libreville)
1993 : Mbilinga FC (Libreville) 2-1 (a.p.) Delta Sports (Libreville)
1994 : AS Mangasport (Moanda) 4-3 Petrosport (Port-Gentil)
1995 : Mbilinga FC (Port-Gentil)
1996 : ASMO/FC 105 (Libreville)
1997 : Mbilinga FC (Port-Gentil)
1998 : Mbilinga FC (Port-Gentil) 3-0 Wongosport (Libreville)
1999 : US Bitam 2-1 Aigles Verts (Port-Gentil)
2000 : AO Evizo (Lambarèné)
2001 : AS Mangasport (Moanda) 1-0 TP Akwembé (Libreville)
2002 : USM Libreville 1-1 (4 - 2) JS Libreville
2003 : US Bitam 1-1 (4 - 3) USM Libreville
2004 : FC 105 Libreville 3-2 AS Mangasport (Moanda)
2005 : AS Mangasport (Moanda) 2-0 Sogéa FC (Libreville)
2006 : Téléstar FC (Libreville) 3-2 FC 105 Libreville
2007 : AS Mangasport (Moanda) 1-0 Sogéa FC (Libreville)
2008 : USM Libreville 2-1 AS Mangasport (Moanda)
2009 : FC 105 Libreville 2-1 (aet) Sogéa FC
2010 : US Bitam 2-1 Missile FC (Libreville)
2011 : AS Mangasport (Moanda) 1-0 AS Pélican
2012 : not held
2013 : CF Mounana (Libreville) 2-0 US Bitam
2014 : not held
2015 : CF Mounana (Libreville) 2-1 AFJ (Libreville)
2016 : CF Mounana (Libreville) 3-0 Akanda FC (Libreville)

References
Source
Gabon - List of Cup Winners, RSSSF.com
Notes

Football competitions in Gabon
Gabon
Recurring sporting events established in 1961